St Tudwal's Lighthouse on Saint Tudwal's Island West is active, but unstaffed. The site of the lighthouse, which marks the north end of Cardigan Bay, was purchased by Trinity House in 1876 at the sum of £111 and the next year the stone building was complete. It gives 1 white and red flash every 15 seconds, the intensity being 12,000 candelas (candle power).

Automated in 1922, it was one of the earlier lights Trinity House automated. It was electrified in 1995. The lighthouse keepers' cottages are now privately owned and used as a holiday home.

The lighthouse building is Grade II listed, as are the lighthousekeeper's cottage and the perimeter walls.

See also

 List of lighthouses in Wales

References

Sources
 Hague, D., B., Lighthouses of Wales Their Architecture and Archaeology (Royal Commission on the Ancient and Historical Monuments of Wales, edited by Hughes, S., 1994)

External links

 Trinity House 
 Video of lighthouse interior and surroundings, late 1980s

Lighthouses completed in 1877
Lighthouses in Wales
Cardigan Bay
Grade II listed lighthouses
Grade II listed buildings in Gwynedd
1877 establishments in Wales